Severland is the third album released by Blame Sally.

Track listing

Personnel 

 Pam Delgado - Vocals, percussion, drums, organ
 Renee Harcourt - Vocals, acoustic guitar, slide guitar, electric guitar, lap steel guitar, banjo, bass, percussion, harmonica
 Jeri Jones - Vocals, acoustic guitar, electric guitar, slide guitar, bass, guitarron
 Monica Pasqual - Vocals, piano, accordion, keyboards, organ, percussion

Additional personnel 
 Chris Kee - Upright bass, cello
 Julie Wolf - Accordion
 Jon Evans - Bass
Produced by Blame Sally at The Laurel Way Studio (Mill Valley, CA))
Engineered by Renee Harcourt and Jon Evans
Mixed by Mark Pistel and Bob Edwards
Mastered by Ken Lee Mastering

External links
 Blame Sally, official website
 Blame Sally at Ninth Street Opus

2007 albums
Blame Sally albums